Tim Lefebvre (born February 4, 1968) is an American bass guitarist. Both as a session musician and band member, he has worked with a wide range of musicians, including David Bowie, The Black Crowes, Elvis Costello, Sting, Empire of the Sun, The Sleepy Jackson, Wayne Krantz, Patti Austin, John Mayer, Jovanotti, Chuck Loeb, Mark Guiliana, Jamie Cullum, Chris Botti, and Knower. A member of the Tedeschi Trucks Band until 2018, he also performed on film and television soundtracks, including Ocean's Twelve, The Departed, Analyze That, The Sopranos, and 30 Rock.

Called a "musical linguist" by Bass Musician magazine, Lefebvre is proficient in various genres, including rock, jazz, fusion, electronica, and R&B.

Lefebvre played bass on David Bowie's final studio album, Blackstar, which was released two days before Bowie's death in 2016.

Equipment
Lefebvre's equipment as published in Bass Player:

Bass guitars
 Moollon P-Classic (with flatwounds and roundwounds)
 Moollon J-Classic 5-string
 Moollon fretless J-Classic
 CallowHill OBS5, "Lafave" Model, "Asshole" bass
 Fender Precision Bass ('63 and '68)
 Fender Jazz Bass ('65 and '77)
 Serek Midwestern Bass
 Guild/DeArmond Starfire
 Mathias Thoma acoustic bass with Gage Realist pickup and Pirastro Evah Pirazzi strings
 American Standard acoustic bass with Realist and D'Addario Zyex strings
J5 Tim Lefebvre Signature

Rig
 Ampeg SVT-VR head with SVT-810E cabinet
 Ampeg vintage B25-B head
 Aguilar Tone Hammer 500 head with SL 112 cabinet

Effects
 Boss OC-2 Octave and RE-20 Space Echo
 Dunlop Way Huge Pork Loin Overdrive, Carbon Copy and Carbon Copy Bright Analog Delay, EchoPlex
 Custom 3Leaf Audio pedalboard with Octabvre octave pedal and You're Doom fuzz pedal, Wonderlove Envelope Fliter
 Darkglass Microtubes Vintage and Microtubes B7K bass preamp
 Electro-Harmonix Frequency Analyzer
 TC Electronic Röttweiler Distortion
 Line 6 Tap Tremolo
 Pigtronix EP2 Envelope Phaser
 Mantic Vitriol, Density Hulk, Proverb
 Pedaltrain 18
 DOD Meatbox
 Daredevil Fuzz
 Pike Amplification Vulcan XXL

Discography

As co-leader
 2000 Clearance Sale, Tim Lefebvre/Zach Danziger
 2007 Rudder, Rudder
 2009 Matorning, Rudder 
 2009 Krantz Carlock Lefebvre
 2010 Domestic Blitz, Tim Lefebvre/Emily Zuzik 
 2016 Let Me Get By, Tedeschi Trucks Band
 2016 Into The Cosmos Vol. I & II, 19 Foot Trio 
 2017 Live from the Fox Oakland, Tedeschi Trucks Band

As sideman
With David Bowie
 2016 Blackstar
 2017 No Plan
 2018 Never Let Me Down 2018

With Till Brönner
 1999 Love
2000 Chattin' with Chet
 2010 At the End of the Day
 2014 The Movie Album

With Uri Caine
 Bedrock 3 (2002)
 Shelf-Life (2005)
 Plastic Temptation (2009)

With Carmen Cuesta 
 1996 One Kiss 
 2004 Peace of Mind

With Bill Evans
 1999 Touch
 2001 Soul Insider

With Wayne Krantz
 Greenwich Mean (1999)
 Your Basic Live (2003)
 Your Basic Live '06 (2007)
 Good Piranha / Bad Piranha (2014)

With Chuck Loeb
 1996 The Music Inside 
 1998 The Moon, the Stars, and the Setting
 2001 In a Heartbeat
 2007 The Love Song Collection

With Donny McCaslin 
 2010 Perpetual Motion 
 2012 Casting for Gravity
 2015 Fast Future
 2016 Beyond Now

With Chris Potter
 2019 Circuits

With Andy Snitzer
 2011 Traveler
 2013 The Rhythm

With others
 1997 Beautiful Love, Eddie Daniels
 1997 Black Guitar, Leni Stern
 1997 Spiral Staircase, Mark Sherman
 1997 Turning Night into Day, Nelson Rangell
 1998 I'll Never Get Over You, Chuck Jackson
 1999 Parable, Pete McCann
 2000 Fool No More, Peter Eldridge
 2000 Jazzpunk, David Fiuczynski
 2000 Loose Ends, Larry John McNally
 2000 New York Night, Richard Dobson
 2000 NYC d'N'B, Droid
 2002 Balance, David Binney
 2004 I Get Along With You Very Well, Tony Lakatos
 2006 Strength, Gil Parris
 2008 Moss, Moss
 2010 30 Rock, Jeff Richmond
 2010 The Pursuit, Jamie Cullum
 2011 Mad Heaven, Peter Eldridge
 2011 Time Together, Michael Franks
 2012 It's Love, Eric Marienthal
 2013 Sentimental Journey, Emmy Rossum
 2015 Hanging On, Knower
 2016 Rich Man, Doyle Bramhall II
 2016 Til They Bang on the Door, Lucy Woodward
 2016 Two Vines, Empire of the Sun
 2016 Angelenos, Emily Zuzik
2019 HAN, Berhana
2021 XXXX, Michael Wollny
 2021 Lee Scratch Perry’s Guide to the Universe, New Age Doom

References

External links 

Living people
1968 births
American jazz double-bassists
Male double-bassists
American jazz bass guitarists
American male bass guitarists
American rock bass guitarists
American session musicians
Guitarists from Massachusetts
People from Foxborough, Massachusetts
Tedeschi Trucks Band members
20th-century American bass guitarists
Jazz musicians from Massachusetts
21st-century double-bassists
20th-century American male musicians
21st-century American male musicians
American male jazz musicians